Douglas Edward Cowan (born 14 August 1958) is a Canadian academic in religious studies and the sociology of religion and currently holds a teaching position at Renison University College, University of Waterloo, Ontario, Canada. Prior to this appointment he was Assistant Professor of Sociology & Religious Studies at the University of Missouri–Kansas City.

Education and career
Cowan was born in Canada and received his undergraduate education at the University of Victoria where he was awarded a Bachelor of Arts degree in English literature. He then proceeded to theological studies and received a Master of Divinity degree from St. Andrews Theological College. His doctoral work, which involved an examination of the Christian countercult movement through the prism of the sociology of knowledge and propaganda theory, was undertaken through the University of Calgary.

While Cowan currently describes himself as a methodological agnostic, he was ordained to the Christian ministry in the United Church of Canada, and held pastoral positions during his doctoral studies. After graduating with a Doctor of Philosophy degree in 1999 Cowan received a joint appointment in the Department of Sociology/CJC and the UMKC Center for Religious Studies. During 2005 he relocated from the US to his current teaching post at the University of Waterloo in Ontario, Canada.

Bibliography

Cowan, Douglas E. (2007). "Episode 712: South Park, Ridicule, and the Cultural Construction of Religious Rivalry". Journal of Religion and Popular Culture. 17. .

See also

 Anti-cult movement
 List of University of Waterloo people

References

External links
 

1958 births
Canadian sociologists
Living people
Ministers of the United Church of Canada
People of the Christian countercult movement
Researchers of new religious movements and cults
Sociologists of religion
University of Calgary alumni
University of Missouri–Kansas City faculty
University of Victoria alumni
Academic staff of the University of Waterloo